Ibrahim Rafik Alma (born 18 October 1991) is a Syrian footballer who plays as a goalkeeper for football club Al-Jaish in Syrian Premier League. Alma is best known for his unique style of long balls from his penalty area, instead of the usual kick, Alma tends to punch the ball back into play.

Career

Club
In 2010, Alma started his career with Al-Wathba from Homs. Later on, he played for Al-Shorta, Al-Wahda and Al-Ittihad, before moving abroad to play for Sepahan in Iran in 2017.

The termination of Alma's expatriate transfer has occurred for three times due to his support to Al-Assad government. The first cancellation was in the 2014–15 season with the Saudi club Al-Shabab. In June 2018, Alma signed for Saudi club Al-Qadsiah, before the club decided to terminate his contract two weeks later. In August 2019, Austria Wien canceled signing Alma, due to pleas from anti-governmental Syrians.

In September 2020, Alma joined newly-promoted club Al-Horgelah.

International
Alma started playing for Syria in 2012. He was part of the team which played against Australia in the 2018 FIFA World Cup qualification – AFC Fourth Round.

References

External links
 
 

1991 births
Living people
Syrian footballers
Association football goalkeepers
Syrian Alawites
People from Homs Governorate
Syrian expatriate footballers
Persian Gulf Pro League players
Expatriate footballers in Iran
2019 AFC Asian Cup players
Al-Shorta Damascus players
Al-Wahda SC (Syria) players
Al-Ittihad Aleppo players
Sepahan S.C. footballers
Al-Jaish Damascus players
Syrian Premier League players
Syria international footballers